"Warning" is a song by American rock band Incubus, released as a single from their fourth studio album, Morning View (2001). It reached number three on the US Billboard Modern Rock Tracks chart (now known as Alternative Airplay), number 27 on the Mainstream Rock Tracks chart, and number four on the Bubbling Under Hot 100.

Music video
The video (set in Sydney, Australia and directed by Francis Lawrence) shows a girl in a hoodie, wearing a digital watch, who stares blankly ahead, apparently oblivious to anyone around her, even though she stands in the middle of crowded areas, namely:

 an airport terminal
 a school classroom
 a church sanctuary aisle
 a grocery aisle
 a busy urban intersection
 an office
 a supermarket
However, at exactly 10:23 AM, she screams in an extremely shrill voice (which is, like most character dialogue in the video save for the band's singers, inaudible and subtitled), and screams for exactly one whole minute.

This process, according to the video, takes place over the course of three days. At the end of the video, it is revealed that exactly 10:24, all the places featured in the video are abandoned, as if the individuals who beheld the girl in any of these environments, and eventually, the entire city's populace, had suddenly vanished or were abducted. This is exemplified by:

 an inner-city public bus whose drivers and passengers have disappeared, but eventually runs onto the sidewalk.
 a dropped coffee mug
 a still-moving cart in the grocery store

The band itself is playing the song in a loft; they also disappear at the end of the video. The message of this song and video urges people to live life to the fullest, because at any moment it could be over.

Personnel
Incubus
 Brandon Boyd – lead vocals
 Mike Einziger – guitar, backing vocals
 Dirk Lance – bass
 Chris Kilmore – turntables
 José Pasillas – drums

Charts

External links

References

2001 songs
2002 singles
Epic Records singles
Incubus (band) songs
Immortal Records singles
Music videos directed by Francis Lawrence
Song recordings produced by Scott Litt
Songs written by Alex Katunich
Songs written by Brandon Boyd
Songs written by Chris Kilmore
Songs written by José Pasillas
Songs written by Mike Einziger